Heinz-Ulrich Walther (born 11 March 1943) is a German former pair skater who represented East Germany and the United Team of Germany in competition. With Heidemarie Steiner, he is the 1970 World bronze medalist and a three-time European bronze medalist (1967–68, 1970). Walther competed at two Winter Olympics, placing 11th in 1964 with Brigitte Wokoeck and fourth with Steiner in 1968.

Skating career 
Heinz-Ulrich Walther teamed up Brigitte Wokoeck by around 1959 and represented the club SC Dynamo Berlin. The pair won the 1963 Blue Swords and two East German national titles, in 1962 and 1964. Representing the United Team of Germany, they placed 11th at the 1964 Winter Olympics in Innsbruck. It was their final competition together.

Walther formed a partnership with Heidemarie Steiner by around 1965. Coached by Heinz-Friedrich Lindner, they represented SC Dynamo Berlin. The pair won the bronze medal at the 1967 European Championships in Ljubljana and repeated the following year at the 1968 European Championships in Västerås. They were selected to represent East Germany at the 1968 Winter Olympics in Grenoble and placed fourth. After obtaining their third European bronze medal at the 1970 European Championships in Leningrad, the pair concluded their competitive career with a World bronze medal, at the 1970 World Championships in Ljubljana.

Walther has worked as an international figure skating judge and ISU technical controller for pair skating.

Personal life 
Walther married Heidemarie Steiner in 1969. He studied medicine and worked at the Charité in Berlin. He was an academic employee in the orthopaedics department at the Center for Complementary Medicine Research – CCM.

Competitive highlights

With Steiner

With Wokoeck

References

 
 personal interview

1943 births
Living people
People from Stendal
People from the Province of Saxony
German male pair skaters
Figure skaters at the 1964 Winter Olympics
Figure skaters at the 1968 Winter Olympics
Olympic figure skaters of East Germany
Olympic figure skaters of the United Team of Germany
Figure skating judges
World Figure Skating Championships medalists
European Figure Skating Championships medalists
Sportspeople from Saxony-Anhalt